Pavlovka is a rural locality (a selo) and the administrative center of Pavlovskoye Rural Settlement, Chernushinsky District, Perm Krai, Russia. The population was 673 as of 2010. There are 11 streets.

Geography 
Pavlovka is located 11 km east of Chernushka (the district's administrative centre) by road. Bolshoy Ulyk is the nearest rural locality.

References 

Rural localities in Chernushinsky District